In Aztec mythology,     (from  "workable metal"  and  "person"  ) or Tēzcatzontēcatl  (from   "mirror",  "four hundred"  and  "person" ) was the god of pulque, of drunkenness and fertility. The deity was also known by his calendrical name,  ("two-rabbit").

 appears in the Mendoza Codex carrying a copper axe.

Notes

References

External links
 Tepoztlan tourist information

Fertility gods
Aztec pulque gods
Mythological rabbits and hares
Alcohol deities